Jingxi Nanfang Hospital Station is a metro station on Line 3 of the Guangzhou Metro. The underground station is located at Guangzhou Avenue North near Nanfang Hospital in the Baiyun District. It started operation on 30October 2010.

Its name is a combination of nearby Jingxi Village and Nanfang Hospital, in order to favour the benefits of both locations. Its Chinese name is currently one of the longest used by the Guangzhou Metro system, with six Chinese characters in total.

Station layout

Exits

References

Railway stations in China opened in 2010
Guangzhou Metro stations in Baiyun District